Jolly Shandy is a type of soft drink mixed by less than 1% ABV (Alcohol by volume) beer and Lemonade.

History 
The first Jolly Shandy in Hong Kong opened in 1986. It is now mostly available in supermarkets, convenience stores, western restaurants, and Chinese restaurants.

The apple flavor Jolly Shandy and the grapefruit flavor Jolly Shandy were released in 1999 and 2001 respectively. The company of Henieken Malaysia Berhad Malaysia re-launched its beverage brand in 2007. The lemon taste was improved and Vitamin C was added into it.

A new version of the beer mix called Jolly Shandy Lychee was introduced to the customers not satisfied with the original taste of Jolly Shandy. The packing size of the Lychee flavored Jolly Shandy is 330 mL and contains 0.6% alcohol content. It is produced in mainland China.

Ingredients 
In Hong Kong, there are currently four flavors of Jolly Shandy: lychee, golden kiwi, lemon, and ginger. Other flavors like apple, peach, and pineapple have been discontinued. Some special flavors of Jolly Shandy such as Mandarin orange flavor are sold in Malaysia and Singapore.

Jolly Shandy is a brand of trendy and energetic beverage under the banner of Carlsberg. It also has vitamin C and a tangy flavor. The ingredients of Jolly Shandy include water, sugar, beer, barley malt, carbonating agent (carbon dioxide), acidity regulator (citric acid), flavoring, Caramel color (E150c), Hops, and antioxidant (E300).

A typical can of Jolly Shandy (330mL with 0.6% alcohol) contains 7.5 grams per 100 mL of sugar, 0 mg of sodium, 0 grams fat, and 36 kilocalories per 100mL.

Design 

Jolly Shandy’s package design has been changed several times since its launch. Its appearance also differs in different regions.

In Hong Kong 
In the 1990s, Jolly Shandy appeared with a two color design, separating the upper and lower parts. Golden “Jolly” and silvery “Shandy” labels were put in the middle part of the can. The three different flavors had their own specific colors. Before being changed to the current design, Jolly Shandy was on sale with a black coating, while there was a lightning sign in the respective colors of the different flvors as decoration. The color of the word “Jolly Shandy” was also changed to silver. In 2013, the design of Jolly Shandy was reworked by a design team led by Alfonso Granati. The two new color designs with bright colors are used to represent the youngster-focused strategy. In the new design, the dot of letter J in the label “Jolly” has been changed to yellow.

In Malaysia 
The design of Jolly Shandy in Malaysia is different from that in Hong Kong. It has the same “Jolly Shandy” label with the Hong Kong product but there are several concentric circles in the background.

Promotions and Advertising

Re-branding 
A new packaging design of Jolly Shandy was introduced in 2013. Carlsberg group had reportedly increased the sales of Jolly Shandy by 30% since the introduction of the Cartils’ redesign. The company slogan (Traditional Chinese：新作為 夠薑轟出嚟！) promotes ginger Jolly Shandy, the company’s latest flavor.

In Mass Media 
The brand’s localized Facebook page was launched in 2013. The Facebook page constantly releases updates and promotions of the product and is most famous for its ‘piggyback’ marketing technique. The page usually looks at events and news stories and comes up with the ideas that allow them to ‘piggyback’ off without having the huge cost. The ironic messages implied in the advertisements have successfully made the page famous and are particularly popular among Hong Kong teenagers. Aside from the Facebook page, the brand also collaborates with local YouTubers and promotes the soft drink through their YouTube channels. The latest Jolly Shandy television commercial was released in 2013, featuring the Cantonese artist G.E.M. The singer collaborated with Jolly Shandy to promote her concert tickets. In addition, Jolly Shandy also advertises on public transportation within the available regions.

See also 
 Carlsberg Group
 Shandy
 Beer in Hong Kong

References 

Cocktails with beer
Beer in Malaysia
Alcoholic drink brands
Carlsberg Group